"Grip", or "(Get A) Grip (On Yourself)", is a single by the Stranglers from the album Rattus Norvegicus. The Stranglers' first single, it reached number 44 in the UK Singles Chart. The song was written by Hugh Cornwell, and featured steel mill worker Eric Clarke on saxophone. The first line of the lyrics references a "Morry Thou" or Morris 1000.

References

1977 debut singles
1977 songs
The Stranglers songs
Song recordings produced by Martin Rushent
Songs written by Hugh Cornwell
Songs written by Dave Greenfield
Songs written by Jet Black
Songs written by Jean-Jacques Burnel
United Artists Records singles